Aleksandar Stipčević (October 10, 1930 – September 1, 2015) was a Croatian archeologist, bibliographer, librarian and historian of Albanian origin who specialized in the study of the Illyrians.

He was born in the village of Arbanasi near Zadar, Croatia (then Zara, Kingdom of Italy), a member of the local Arbanasi community. He was a full professor at the University of Zagreb from 1987 until his retirement in 1997. He was a member of the Academy of Sciences and Arts of Kosovo.

His 1974 book Iliri ("The Illyrians"), has been translated into English, Italian and Albanian. He was awarded the Order of Skanderbeg by Albania.

Works
 Gli Iliri ("Illyrians"; 1966)
 Arte degli Illiri ("The Illyrian Art"; 1963)
 Iliri: povijest, život, kultura (1974)
 Bibliografija antičke arheologije u Jugoslaviji (I–II, 1977)
 Kultni simboli kod Ilira ("The Illyrian Cult Symbols"; 1981)
 Povijest knjige ("The History of Books"; 1985, extended edition in 2006)
 Cenzura u knjižnicama ("Censorship and Libraries"; 1992)
 O savršenom cenzoru (1994)
 Sudbina knjige (2000)
 Socijalna povijest knjige u Hrvata (I–III, 2004–08)
 Tradicijska kultura zadarskih Arbanasa (2011)
Some of them are translated to other languages.

He was the editor-in-chief of the second volume of the Croatian Biographical Lexicon (1983–1989).

References

1930 births
20th-century Croatian historians
Academic staff of the University of Zagreb
2015 deaths
Recipients of the Order of Skanderbeg (1990–)
21st-century Croatian historians
Arbanasi people
Croatian male writers
20th-century male writers
Illyrologists
Croatian archaeologists
Members of the Academy of Sciences and Arts of Kosovo